The Vedensky okrug was a district (okrug) of the Terek Oblast of the Caucasus Viceroyalty of the Russian Empire. The area of the Vedensky okrug made up part of the North Caucasian Federal District of Russia. The district was eponymously named for its administrative centre, Vedeno.

Administrative divisions 
The subcounties (uchastoks) of the Vedensky okrug were as follows:

Demographics

Kavkazskiy kalendar 

Notes

References

Bibliography 

Okrugs of Terek Oblast